Cabot Square is one of the central squares of the Canary Wharf Development on the Isle of Dogs.

The square includes a fountain and several works of art, and is the address for the London Offices of Credit Suisse and Morgan Stanley.

In the northwest corner of the square is a small memorial stone to Michael von Clemm, an international banker of the 1960s, 70s and 80s, who had one of the original ideas for the development of docklands into a financial centre and who was Chairman of CSFB, a forerunner to Credit Suisse's Investment Banking division

Cabot Place, on the east side of the square is a large shopping centre, and the square is also home to several restaurants including First Edition, Sri Nam and Corney and Barrow.

Cabot Hall 

Cabot Hall, on the east side of the square was a large banqueting and performance hall which opened in 1991 and is the venue for regular concerts and events. In 2006 Canary Wharf Group announced that Cabot Hall would close at the end of 2006 to be converted into additional retail and restaurants, and in 2011 the restaurant space was filled by Scottish restaurant Boisdale.

Cabot Square and Cabot Hall are named after Italian explorer John Cabot.

See also 
1 Cabot Square
25 Cabot Square
Cabot Hall
Canary Wharf

References

External links 
 Canary Wharf Website
 360 degree panorama of Cabot Sq.

Squares in the London Borough of Tower Hamlets
Tourist attractions in the London Borough of Tower Hamlets